Bae Ki-sung (born March 13, 1972) is a South Korean singer and radio presenter. He and Lee Jong-won comprise the duo Can, which rose to fame upon the release of their debut album Version 1.0 in 1998.

Discography

Can

Solo artist

Filmography

Television drama

Film

Stage and musical theatre

References

External links
 

1972 births
Living people
South Korean male singers
South Korean pop singers
South Korean male musical theatre actors
South Korean radio presenters
People from Geoje
South Korean Buddhists